Jennifer Tooker is an American businesswoman and politician serving as the First Selectwoman of Westport, Connecticut since November 2021. A Republican, Tooker previously served as Second Selectwoman from 2017 to 2021.

References 

Westport, Connecticut

Connecticut Republicans
21st-century American women politicians
21st-century American politicians
University of Notre Dame alumni

Living people

Year of birth missing (living people)